Phalonidia baccatana is a species of moth of the family Tortricidae. It is found in Peru.

The wingspan is about 21 mm. The ground colour of the forewings is cream, partly suffused with ferruginous. The costa is brown with some cream spots. The markings are brown with ferruginous parts. There are also pearl dots. The hindwings are whitish with grey suffusions in the posterior area.

Etymology
The species name refers to the presence of glossy dots on the forewings and is derived from Latin baccata (meaning pearly).

References

Moths described in 2010
Phalonidia